Ctenucha (pronounced "ten-OOCH-ah") is a genus of moths in the family Erebidae.

Etymology 
The genus name Ctenucha was coined by William Kirby from the Greek meaning "having a comb", a reference to the showy antennae of some species.

Species
 Ctenucha affinis Druce, 1884
 Ctenucha albipars
 Ctenucha andrei
 Ctenucha annulata
 Ctenucha aymara (Schaus, 1892)
 Ctenucha biformis
 Ctenucha braganza (Schaus, 1892)
 Ctenucha bruneri
 Ctenucha brunnea Stretch, 1872 – brown ctenucha, brown-winged ctenucha
 Ctenucha cajonata
 Ctenucha circe (Cramer, [1780])
 Ctenucha clavia (Druce, 1883)
 Ctenucha cressonana Grote, 1863 – Cresson's ctenucha
 Ctenucha cyaniris Hampson, 1898
 Ctenucha devisum (Walker, 1856)
 Ctenucha editha (Walker, 1856)
 Ctenucha fosteri
 Ctenucha garleppi
 Ctenucha hilliana
 Ctenucha laura (Hampson, 1898)
 Ctenucha manuela
 Ctenucha mennisata
 Ctenucha mortia
 Ctenucha multifaria (Walker, 1854) – California ctenucha
 Ctenucha nana
 Ctenucha nantana
 Ctenucha neglecta (Boisduval, 1832)
 Ctenucha palmeira (Schaus, 1892)
 Ctenucha pohli
 Ctenucha popayana
 Ctenucha projecta Dognin
 Ctenucha quadricolor (Walker, 1866)
 Ctenucha reducta
 Ctenucha refulgens
 Ctenucha reimoseri
 Ctenucha rubrovenata
 Ctenucha rubriceps Walker, 1854
 Ctenucha rubroscapus (Ménétriés, 1857) – red-shouldered ctenucha, Walsingham's ctenucha
 Ctenucha ruficeps Walker, 1854
 Ctenucha schausi
 Ctenucha semistria (Walker, 1854)
 Ctenucha signata
 Ctenucha subsemistria
 Ctenucha tapajoza
 Ctenucha togata (Druce, 1884)
 Ctenucha tucumana
 Ctenucha venosa Walker, 1854 – veined ctenucha
 Ctenucha virginica (Esper, 1794) – Virginia ctenucha
 Ctenucha vittigerum (Blanchard, 1852)

References

External links

 
Ctenuchina
Moth genera